Samsung Electro-Mechanics (SEM, Korean: 삼성전기) is a multinational electronic component company headquartered in Suwon, Gyeonggi-do, South Korea. It is a subsidiary of the Samsung Group. The company produces chip parts such as MLCCs, camera modules, network modules and printed circuit boards.

Established in 1973 as Samsung Sanyo Parts, the name was changed to Samsung Electric Parts the following year. 
The name was again changed to Samsung Electronics Parts in 1977, and then to Samsung Electro-Mechanics in 1987. 
The company is headquartered in Suwon, South Korea, with additional manufacturing facilities in Sejong and Busan.This company works on semiconductor components.

Products 
 MLCC (Multi-Layer Ceramic Capacitor)
 Camera Modules
 Organic Semiconductor Substrate
 Rigid-Flex PCBs

Governance 
As of January 2020, Samsung Electro-Mechanics’ Board of Directors is composed of 3 internal directors and 4 outside directors, and there are 5 sub committees within the Board of Director. These committees are the Compensation Committee, Management Committee, Audit Committee, Outside Director Nomination Committee, and the Internal Trading Committee. Currently, an outside director is serving as Chairman of the Board for Samsung Electro-Mechanics.

Environment management

Greenhouse gas 
In the results of the evaluation of CDP (Carbon Disclosure Project) Korea Committee in 2016, Samsung Electro-Mechanics has been selected in CDP Korea Hall of Fame for three consecutive years in 2014.

Energy 
In the 34th Energy-Saving Promotion conference awarding a prize to person who contributed to the improvement of energy efficiency and overcoming the power supply crisis, Chi-joon Choi, CEO of Samsung Electro-Mechanics was awarded the Silver Tower Industry medal with best honor

In 2005, Samsung Electro-Mechanics started to provide free artificial joint surgery for low income families as part of the company's medical support policy, and as of 2016, 514 beneficiaries from Gyeonggi-do, Chungcheong-do and Gangwon-do regions underwent the procedure.

Since 2006, a badminton tournament for disabled is regularly held annually, and about 3,000 people including the players, supporters and volunteer service teams participate from 16 cities around the country.

Since 2008, the national music competition for handicapped students, in which individuals or groups of students with developmental disabilities, visual impairment or physical disabilities can participate and compete, is being hosted along with TJB Daejeon TV.

In 2013, Samsung Electro-Mechanics founded an orchestra, hello!SEMCO, composed of 35 children and teenage members with disabilities. They recently held their first regular concert.

References

External links 

 
 Official Blog 
 Samsung Electro-mechanics's Badminton Club

Companies based in Suwon
Companies listed on the Korea Exchange
Computer memory companies
Computer storage companies
Display technology companies
Electronics companies of South Korea
Electronics companies established in 1973
Foundry semiconductor companies
Electro-Mechanics
Semiconductor companies of South Korea
South Korean companies established in 1973
Technology companies of South Korea
1970s initial public offerings